Ramona is a town in Washington County, Oklahoma, United States. The population was 535 at the 2010 census. The town began as Bon-Ton, but changed its name to Ramona in 1899 in honor of the Helen Hunt Jackson novel of the same name. The town is one of four communities that makes up the consolidated Caney Valley School District.

Ramona was an oil town and was also a stop for the Santa Fe railroad. When the oil dried up, there was no other industry to support Ramona, so the town began to die out. Very little business remains in the town, aside from a garage, a bank, a medical clinic, a small grocery, and sundry other small businesses. For 30 years the town was under the jurisdiction of the Washington County Sheriff's Office, after the police department disbanded and the Chief of Police was sentenced to prison. Under the leadership of the former mayor, the late Robert Fiddler, the police department was reinstated, the water lines were repaired/replaced, and a grant was accepted from the Cherokee Nation to repave the streets. The town also supplies natural gas service to the Wal-Mart distribution center five miles north of town.

Recently, under the mayoralty of Cyle Miller, the Cherokee Nation opened the Cherokee Casino Ramona off U.S. Route 75 and Road 3200, which is a significant boom to the local economy. This led to Ramona annexing a considerable portion of land and greatly increasing the size of Ramona proper.

Geography
Ramona is located at  (36.531102, -95.923632).

Demographics

As of the census of 2000, there were 564 people, 245 households, and 161 families residing in the town. There were 265 housing units at an average density of 345.6 per square mile (132.9/km2). The racial makeup of the town was 72.70% White, 0.18% African American, 14.72% Native American, 0.18% from other races, and 12.23% from two or more races. Hispanic or Latino of any race were 1.24% of the population.

There were 245 households, out of which 31.0% had children under the age of 18 living with them, 48.2% were married couples living together, 13.5% had a female householder with no husband present, and 33.9% were non-families. 32.7% of all households were made up of individuals, and 18.4% had someone living alone who was 65 years of age or older. The average household size was 2.30 and the average family size was 2.84.

In the town, the population was spread out, with 25.4% under the age of 18, 10.3% from 18 to 24, 26.8% from 25 to 44, 19.0% from 45 to 64, and 18.6% who were 65 years of age or older. The median age was 37 years. For every 100 females, there were 90.5 males. For every 100 females age 18 and over, there were 89.6 males.

The median income for a household in the town was $26,667, and the median income for a family was $36,667. Males had a median income of $27,361 versus $24,375 for females. The per capita income for the town was $14,393. About 10.2% of families and 14.7% of the population were below the poverty line, including 16.5% of those under age 18 and 25.9% of those age 65 or over.

Notable people
Gary Ward, college baseball coach

References

Towns in Washington County, Oklahoma
Towns in Oklahoma
Tulsa metropolitan area